Anna Bates may refer to:
 Anna Haining Bates, Canadian woman famed for her great height
 Anna Bates (bowls), Zimbabwean lawn bowler

See also
 Ann Bates, loyalist spy during the American Revolution